Orthotylus empetri is a species of bug from the Miridae family that can be found in European countries such as France and Spain.

References

Insects described in 1977
Hemiptera of Europe
empetri